Nansenia oblita, also called the forgotten argentine (from the specific name oblita, "forgotten") or the Mediterranean large-eyed argentine, is a species of fish in the pencil smelt family (Microstomatidae).

Description
Nansenia oblita is silvery in colour. Its length is maximum . It has 10 or 11 dorsal soft rays, 9 or 10 anal soft rays, 28–30 gill rakers, 42–45 vertebrae, and 4 branchiostegal rays. The proximal part of the adipose fin is unpigmented and its entire body is covered with guanine. The base of the caudal and procurrent caudal-fin rays are pigmented.

Habitat
It is commonly found off Messina, Sicily.

Behaviour
It spawns during winter in the Mediterranean, perhaps later in the Atlantic. It lays spherical eggs of about  diameter. It feeds on zooplankton.

References

Microstomatidae
Fish described in 1887
Taxa named by Luigi Facciolà